Alfredo Cachia Zammit was a Maltese politician. He was elected to the Parliament of Malta. He was a philanthropist and land-owner, and a minor figure in Maltese politics; within the Nationalist Party, he was a follower of the moderate Ignazio Panzavecchia.

References 

1890 births
1960 deaths
Nationalist Party (Malta) politicians
20th-century Maltese politicians
People from Żejtun